KZYY-LP is a Spanish language religious formatted broadcast radio station licensed to Tyler, Texas, USA.  KZYY-LP serves the northern half, within the immediate City Limits of Tyler. It is owned and operated by Ministerio de Dios Pentecostal.

KZYY-LP's studio is located at 5763 Linwood Street, at the Iglesia de Dios Pentecostal, in the northeast section of Tyler.

History
Iglesia de Dios Pentecostal, under its licensee Ministerio de Dios Pentecostal, received a construction permit to build a low power Class L1 FM radio station, licensed to Tyler, on February 3, 2015. The facility received a License to Cover from the Federal Communications Commission on March 16, 2015.

On February 4, 2019, KZYY-LP began broadcasting a program, "El Camino a la Vida Eterna" (or "The Road to Eternal Life"), a production of another Tyler-based Spanish church, Iglesia de Cristo en Greenbriar, on Mondays at 4pm.

References

External links
 Radio Esperanza 93.7 Online
 

2015 establishments in Texas
ZYY-LP
Radio stations established in 2015
ZYY-LP
ZYY-LP
Tyler, Texas